The Chamoli disaster may refer to:

The 2021 Uttarakhand flood
The 2012 Himalayan flash floods
The 1999 Chamoli earthquake